Karate at the 2005 Southeast Asian Games took place in the Mandaue Coliseum, Mandaue City, Cebu, Philippines. The participants competed in different weight categories in both the men's and women's competitions. The event was held from November 27–29.

Medal table

Medalists

Kata

Men's kumite

Women's kumite

References

External links
Southeast Asian Games Official Results

2005 Southeast Asian Games events
2005
2005 in karate